The 2017–18 Slovak First Football League (known as the Slovak Fortuna Liga for sponsorship reasons) was the 25th season of first-tier football league in Slovakia, since its establishment in 1993. MŠK Žilina were the defending champions, after winning their 7th Slovak championship.

Format changes 
Starting from this season, the competition format was changed. The previous 33-match round robin structure was replaced by a regular stage round of 22 games and a playoff round, where 12 teams are divided into two groups: championship group (top-6 teams after regular stage) and relegation group (bottom 6 teams). The playoff round uses a 10-game round robin structure.

The top team in the championship group wins the league title and qualifies to next season's Champions League qualification; the runner-up and 3rd team obtain spots of next season's Europa League Qualification. The bottom team of the relegation group will be relegated to next season's 2. Liga and replaced by the 2. Liga winner. The second-bottom ranked team will play a two-leg relegation playoff with the runner-up of 2. Liga.

Should one of the top 3 teams wins of the 2017-18 Slovak Cup, Europa League qualification playoffs will be held among the 4th, 5th, 6th team in the championship group and the top team of the relegation round. The 4th team plays the top team of the relegation group and the 5th plays the 6th in the semifinals. Winners of the semifinals will play the final to determine the Europa League qualification spot. Europa League qualification playoff games will be one-leg and played at the home pitch of the higher-ranked team.

Teams
A total of 12 teams competed in the league, including 11 sides from the 2016–17 season and one promoted from the 2. liga.

Withdrawal of Spartak Myjava was confirmed on 21 December 2016. The withdrawn team was meant to be replaced initially by FC VSS Košice, but that team was rejected a promotion and went into bankruptcy. FC Nitra was promoted instead of Košice.

2017–18 Teams

 MŠK Žilina
 ŠK Slovan Bratislava
 MFK Ružomberok
 AS Trenčín
 FK Železiarne Podbrezová
 FC Spartak Trnava
 FC DAC 1904 Dunajská Streda
 FK Senica
 FC ViOn Zlaté Moravce
 MFK Zemplín Michalovce
 1. FC Tatran Prešov
 FC Nitra

Stadiums and locations

1Tatran played their home matches in this season at NTC Poprad in Poprad while Tatran Stadium went under renovation.

Personnel and kits

Managerial changes

Regular stage

League table

Results
Each team plays home-and-away against every other team in the league, for a total of 22 matches played each.

Championship group

Relegation group

Europa League play-offs
Teams placed between 4th and 7th position will take part in the Europa league play-offs. The best of them will play against the fourth-placed of the championship play-offs to determine the Europa League play-off winners. The winners will qualify for the first qualifying round of the 2018–19 UEFA Europa League.

All times are UTC+2.

Semi-finals

Final

Relegation play-offs
Team placed 11th in the relegation match will face 2nd team from 2. Liga 2017–18 to for two spots in the next season.

All times are UTC+2.

First leg

Second leg

2–2 on aggregate. FK Senica won on away goal.

Season statistics

Top goalscorers

a Included 2 play-off goals

Top assists

Hat-tricks

Clean sheets

Discipline

Player

Most yellow cards: 12
 Yasin Pehlivan (Trnava)

Most red cards: 2
 Ján Krivák (Podbrezová)
 Damián Bariš (Zl.Moravce)

Club

Most yellow cards: 75
FK Senica

Most red cards: 7
FC ViOn Zlaté Moravce

Awards

Player of the Month

Top Eleven
Source:
Goalkeeper:  Lukáš Hroššo (FC Nitra)
Defence:  Erick Davis (DAC D.Streda),  Ľubomír Šatka (DAC D.Streda),  Boris Godál (Spartak Trnava),  Boris Sekulić (ŠK Slovan)
Midfield:  Erik Pačinda (DAC D.Streda),  Marin Ljubičić (DAC D.Streda),   Aschraf El Mahdioui (AS Trenčín),  Aleksandar Čavrić (Slovan Bratislava)
Attack:  Marvin Egho (Spartak Trnava),   Samuel Mráz (MŠK Žilina)

Top Eleven U-21
Source:
Goalkeeper:  Martin Vantruba (Spartak Trnava)
Defence:  Matúš Kuník (FC Nitra),  Dávid Hancko (MŠK Žilina),  Richard Križan (FC Nitra),  Andrej Kadlec (Spartak Trnava)
Midfield:  Aschraf El Mahdioui (AS Trenčín),  Miroslav Káčer (MŠK Žilina),  Erik Jirka (Spartak Trnava),  Ewerton (Zl.Moravce),  Hilary Gong (AS Trenčín)
Attack:   Samuel Mráz (MŠK Žilina)

Individual Awards

Manager of the season

Nestor El Maestro (Spartak Trnava)

Player of the Year

Boris Godál (Spartak Trnava)

Young player of the Year

Samuel Mráz (MŠK Žilina)

See also
2017–18 Slovak Cup
2017–18 2. Liga (Slovakia)
 List of transfers summer 2017
 List of transfers winter 2017-18
 List of foreign players

References

2017–18 in European association football leagues
2017-18
1